Tagaramphung is a small village of the Thangals, a sub tribe of the Naga people, situated in the northern part of Manipur. The village was formerly known as Yaikongpao.

References

Naga people
Villages in Senapati district